Sydalen is a village in the municipality of Vågan in Nordland county, Norway. Strauman Church is located in Sydalen.

References

Vågan
Villages in Nordland